The Samsung Galaxy Xcover 4 is an Android smartphone produced by Samsung Electronics and released in April 2017. It is the successor to the Samsung Galaxy Xcover 3. The Xcover 4 is waterproof and dustproof designed around the IP68 specifications.
The Samsung Galaxy Xcover 4 has models SM-G390F, SM-G390W, And SM-G390Y. This phone has been succeeded by the Xcover 4s.

References 

Android (operating system) devices
Samsung Galaxy
Samsung smartphones
Mobile phones introduced in 2017
Mobile phones with user-replaceable battery